Oluf Hansen Hagen (11 May 1845 – 18 October 1903) was a Norwegian politician for the Liberal Party.

He was elected to the Norwegian Parliament in 1898, representing the constituency of Trondhjem og Levanger. He served one term, from 1898 to 1900.

References

1844 births
1903 deaths
Politicians from Trondheim
Liberal Party (Norway) politicians
Members of the Storting